Brandon Kyle Belt (born April 20, 1988), nicknamed "Baby Giraffe", "Sparky", and “Captain”, is an American professional baseball first baseman for the Toronto Blue Jays of Major League Baseball (MLB). He has previously played in MLB for the San Francisco Giants.

Belt played college baseball for San Jacinto College and the University of Texas at Austin. The Giants selected Belt in the fifth round of the 2009 MLB draft. He made his MLB debut during the 2011 season and was a member of the 2012 World Series and 2014 World Series championship teams with the Giants. Belt was an All Star in 2016. Belt signed with the Blue Jays as a free agent after the 2022 season.

Early life
Belt attended Hudson High School in Hudson, Texas, where he was a pitcher and outfielder. The Boston Red Sox selected Belt in the 11th round (343rd overall) of the 2006 Major League Baseball draft as a pitcher, but chose not to offer  him the signing bonus that would make him forgo his college commitment.

College career
Belt enrolled at San Jacinto College in order to preserve his ability to negotiate with Boston, but eventually chose not to sign. He pitched and served as a designated hitter for San Jacinto's baseball team in 2007. He was drafted in the 11th round (348th overall) of the 2007 Major League Baseball draft by the Atlanta Braves, but again chose not to sign.

Belt transferred to the University of Texas, where he played college baseball for the Texas Longhorns for two years. In his 2008 sophomore season, Belt batted .319 with six home runs and a team-high 65 runs batted in while also pitching in 16 games as a reliever. After the 2008 season, he played collegiate summer baseball with the Harwich Mariners of the Cape Cod Baseball League. As a junior, Belt transitioned to first base due to shoulder problems.  In 2009, during his junior season, Belt batted .323 in 63 games (76-for-235) with eight home runs, 43 runs batted in, and 15 stolen bases, while recording a .989 fielding percentage, as part of the Texas team that finished as runner-up in the College World Series.

Professional career

Draft and minor leagues
The San Francisco Giants selected Belt in the fifth round (147th overall) of the 2009 Major League Baseball draft after his junior year, and he signed for a signing bonus of $200,000. He started his professional career with the High-A Giants affiliate in San Jose, for whom he was a mid-season All Star. He worked with the Giants coaching staff and made an adjustment to his swing mechanics that helped him move quickly through the Giants farm system. He hit well at all three levels in 2010 finishing the year batting .352/.455/.620 with 23 home runs and 112 runs batted in, gaining attention as one of the Giants top prospects.

In 2010, he played for the San Francisco Giants Class-AAA-affiliate Fresno Grizzlies, and was named a Baseball America Minor League All Star and an MiLB Organization All Star. He also played for the East Division Scottsdale Scorpions in the Arizona Fall League, where he was named a Rising Star and to the All Prospect Team. Belt played in the Arizona Fall League Rising Stars Game for the East team.

He was ranked as the third-best first baseman prospect on MLB.com prior to the 2011 season. He was ranked as the 26th-best prospect overall by MLB.com.

San Francisco Giants (2011–2022)

2011

After his strong showing in the minor leagues, Belt was invited to spring training in 2011, where he played in 28 exhibition games, the most on the team, and batted .282 with 3 home runs.  On March 30, 2011, the Giants announced that Belt had been named to the opening day major league roster, a moment captured in the series premiere of The Franchise.  He started in his first major league game the next day and singled off of Los Angeles Dodgers pitcher Clayton Kershaw in his first major league at bat, finishing 1-for-3 with a walk. Belt hit his first major league home run on April 1, 2011, off Chad Billingsley. On April 20, Belt was optioned to Triple-A Fresno to make room on the roster for Cody Ross. He was hitting .192 in 17 games.  Belt was recalled to the Giants on May 26 after injuries to Buster Posey and Darren Ford.  On June 4, Belt was diagnosed with a hairline fracture, and was sent to the 15-day DL after being hit by a pitch in a game against the St. Louis Cardinals. On July 7, Belt was removed from the DL and optioned back to Fresno to continue his rehab assignment.

On July 19, Belt was recalled to the Giants to give slumping first baseman Aubrey Huff a break.  In his first game back in the majors, Belt hit a solo home run and a tiebreaking two-run double in the seventh inning to help the Giants defeat the Dodgers.  On August 4, Belt was optioned back to Fresno to make room on the roster for Mark DeRosa. On August 14, one day after being called up to the majors for a fourth time, Belt hit two home runs in a 5–2 victory over the Florida Marlins in Miami. It was the first multi home run game of his career.

In August 2011, Belt was given the nickname "The Baby Giraffe" by Giants announcer Duane Kuiper, who commented that Belt looked like the animal while tracking down a fly ball in left field during a game against the Milwaukee Brewers.  The nickname stuck and Belt became a fan favorite in San Francisco, with "Baby Giraffe" hats rivaling the number of "Panda" hats in the stands at AT&T Park in September 2011 (the panda hats are a reference to Giants star Pablo Sandoval, sometimes called "the Kung-Fu Panda"). Six Flags Discovery Kingdom named a real baby giraffe born in August after Belt.

2012
Belt made the Giants' opening day roster for 2012.  Belt split time at first base with Aubrey Huff and Brett Pill at the beginning of the season.  After Huff was injured and Pill struggled at the plate, Belt became the everyday first baseman and finished the season strong, hitting .328 from July 24 to the end of the season.

In the 2012 NLCS, Belt hit .304 (7-for-23) in six games with a .565 slugging percentage.  On October 28, 2012, Belt won his first World Series ring when the Giants swept the Detroit Tigers.  Belt played a key part of the Giants' clinching game in the World Series, starting the scoring by hitting a triple to right field in the second inning, scoring Hunter Pence from second.

2013
Belt set new career highs in 2013, batting .289 with 17 home runs and 67 runs batted in during 150 games, and he led the Giants with an .841 on-base plus slugging.  Belt got off to a slow start after losing 11 pounds to an opening-week stomach virus, but finished strong, batting .346 over the season's final 51 games.  Belt credited his improvement to changing his grip and moving back in the batter's box.  Belt was named National League Player of the Week for August 5–11 after collecting hits in all seven games played, while batting .440 (11-for-25) with five runs batted in, 20 total bases, two home runs, and eight runs scored.

2014
On February 1, 2014, Belt signed a one-year $2.9 million contract to avoid arbitration.  On May 9, while batting at Dodger Stadium, Belt was hit on his left thumb by Dodgers pitcher Paul Maholm, suffering a broken thumb.  Belt was activated from the disabled list on July 4, only to return to the disabled list on July 21 after suffering a concussion while fielding during batting practice. Belt was activated August 2, but was placed on the DL again August 8 when his concussion symptoms continued.  Belt was reactivated from the disabled list on September 15.

In the 2014 postseason, Belt batted .295 (18-for-61) with 8 runs batted in and 11 walks in 17 games.  In Game 2 of the 2014 NLDS versus the Washington Nationals, Belt hit a solo home run in the top of the 18th inning to break a 1–1 tie in the 18th inning after 6 hours and 23 minutes of game play, helping the Giants to an eventual 3–1 series win. On October 29, 2014, Belt won his second World Series ring when the Giants defeated the Kansas City Royals in seven games.  Belt, along with teammate Hunter Pence, hit safely in all seven games of the series, the only players on either team to do so.

2015
On February 3, 2015, Belt and the Giants avoided arbitration by agreeing to a one-year, $3.6 million contract.  On May 17, Belt accomplished a rare feat when he collected 3 hits, including a home run, for 3 games in a row against the Cincinnati Reds.  He was only the second Giants player to do so since 1900.  Barry Bonds had a similar three-game streak in 2000.  Belt recorded another unusual statistic since he hit the home runs on 3 consecutive days after not hitting any in his first 30 games.  The last player to have done so was also Belt in the 2012 season when he hit home runs in 3 consecutive games after not hitting any in his first 48 games that season.

For the season, Belt appeared in 137 games, batting .280/.356/.478, and set new career-highs with 18 home runs and 68 runs batted in. For the season, he led all major league hitters in line drive percentage (28.7%).

2016
On February 10, 2016, Belt and the Giants agreed to a one-year, $6.2 million contract to avoid arbitration. On April 9, 2016, Belt and the Giants agreed to a 5-year, $72.8 million contract extension through 2021. After winning the 2016 National League All-Star Final Vote, Belt was selected to his first All Star Game.

In 2016, Belt led all Giants batters with 104 walks, 17 home runs, a .394 on-base percentage, and .868 on-base plus slugging, and set a new career-high with 82 runs batted in.  Belt became the first Giant to record 100 walks in a season since Barry Bonds in 2007. For the season, he had the lowest ground ball percentage of all major league hitters (26.3%).

2017

In 2017, Belt tied his career-high with 18 home runs before suffering a season-ending concussion on August 4.

2018
On April 22, Belt set a new MLB record for most pitches seen in a single at bat, with 21 against the Angels' starting pitcher, Jaime Barria. Belt fouled off 16 pitches (15 with two strikes) against the right-hander in his first plate appearance of the game, in the top of the first inning. The at bat lasted 12 minutes and 45 seconds, and ended with a fly out to right fielder Kole Calhoun.  Belt was also named the National League Player of the Week on May 21. On June 2, Belt underwent an appendectomy. In 2018 he batted .253/.342/.414 with 14 home runs and 46 runs batted in.

2019
In 2019 Belt had 526 at bats and hit .234/.339/.403 with 76 runs, 17 home runs, and 57 runs batted in. He had the lowest ground ball percentage in the National League (28.3%).

2020
In the pandemic-shortened 2020 season, Belt batted .309/.425/.591 with 9 home runs and 30 runs batted in during 51 games. He had the fourth-highest on-base plus slugging in the National League (1.015).

2021
In the 2021 regular season for the Giants, Belt batted .274/.378/.597 with a .975 on-base plus slugging, 59 runs batted in, and a career high 29 home runs in 325 at bats. He became a free agent after the season, but accepted the Giants $18.4 million qualifying offer to remain with them for another season.

2022
Following the retirement of catcher Buster Posey, Belt became the longest tenured member of the Giants. In 2022 he batted .213/.326/.350 in 254 at bats, and had the slowest sprint speed of all Giants players, at 24.3 feet per second.

Toronto Blue Jays
On January 10, 2023, Belt signed a one-year contract worth $9.3 million with the Toronto Blue Jays.

Personal life
Belt married his high school sweetheart Haylee Stephenson on December 3, 2010, in their hometown of Lufkin, Texas. They have two sons, born in August 2014 and July 2018.

References

External links

 
 Brandon and Brandon blog

1988 births
Living people
National League All-Stars
People from Nacogdoches, Texas
Baseball players from Texas
San Francisco Giants players
San Jacinto Central Ravens baseball players
Texas Longhorns baseball players
San Jose Giants players
Richmond Flying Squirrels players
Fresno Grizzlies players
Scottsdale Scorpions players
Leones del Escogido players
American expatriate baseball players in the Dominican Republic
Major League Baseball first basemen
Harwich Mariners players